Florence Nellie Udell, CBE, RGN, SRN, FRSH, FSCM was a British nurse, nursing administrator and government official.

Career
Florence Udell served as Secretary to the RCN's organisation in Scotland in 1931. In 1944 Udell was appointed Chief Nurse in the Health Division of the European Regional Officer of the United Nations Relief and Rehabilitation Administration (UNRRA). She would later go on to serve as Colonial Office Chief Nursing Officer (COCNO) and as Nursing Adviser at the Ministry of Overseas Development.

The World Health Organization received advice on nursing from a number of bodies, particularly its Expert Nursing Committees. The first, in 1950, had both Udell, and another nurse, Olive Baggallay, as members, and made a series of statements, which were to be echoed, in one form or another, over several decades.
Nurses are needed in greater numbers than other categories of health workers because they have direct, individualized, and lasting contact with people, sick and well. In this sense, nurses are the final agents of health services ... the stage of development of nursing varies greatly from culture to culture...

Awards
Udell was awarded an MBE (1941), OBE (1958) and a CBE (1968).

RCN Presidency
Udell served as President of the RCN from 1964–66 as principal nurse in charge of the British section of the United Nations Rehabilitation and Relief Administration (UNRRA).

References

External links
 Journal of the Royal Society for the Promotion of Health, Vol. 74, No. 9, pp. 914-915 (1954) excerpt
Northwest NHF website (PDF document)
Reference to Udell's work in the Colonial Office

British civil servants
Scottish nurses
Commanders of the Order of the British Empire
Year of birth missing
Year of death missing
Place of birth missing
Place of death missing
Presidents of the Royal College of Nursing